Pioneer Mountain at  high is a peak in the Pioneer Mountains on the border of Blaine and Custer counties in Idaho. The peak is also located on the border of Sawtooth and Salmon-Challis National Forests. The southern and western slopes of the peak are drained by tributaries of Muldoon Creek, which as a tributary of the Little Wood River. The northern and eastern slopes are drained by tributaries of Star Hope Creek, which is a tributary of the Big Lost River.

References 

Mountains of Idaho
Mountains of Blaine County, Idaho
Mountains of Custer County, Idaho
Salmon-Challis National Forest
Sawtooth National Forest